Alban Sylë Meha (born 26 April 1986) is a Kosovar professional footballer who plays as a midfielder for German club KSV Hessen Kassel.

Early life
Meha was born in Mitrovica, SFR Yugoslavia, to Kosovo Albanian parents from Prekaz. He is the grandchild of Tahir Meha, an Albanian rights activist who with his father resisted against the Yugoslav People's Army and police force until they were killed in 1981. His older brother Feriz Meha is a semi-professional footballer who plays as a forward for the German club SV Bonlanden.

Club career

Youth career
In his youth, Meha joined the local teams TV Kemnat 1890 and SV 1845 Esslingen.

Stuttgarter Kickers
When Meha was nine years old, he joined the Stuttgarter Kickers and remained in the junior side for ten years. When Meha turned 19, he officially signed for the senior team. In July 2005, Meha joined the senior team of Stuttgarter Kickers. However, he remained on the reserve squad and never made an appearance on the first team.

VfL Kirchheim
In December 2005, Meha moved to VfL Kirchheim and played one and a half seasons at Kirchheim, making 54 appearances and scoring 16 goals.

SSV Reutlingen
Meha played three seasons at Reutlingen, making 82 appearances and scoring 16 goals. He then moved to Eintracht Trier.

Eintracht Trier
Meha played one season for Eintracht Trier, making a total of 33 appearances, scoring 15 goals and providing 16 assists. He helped the club win the Rhineland Cup and helped the club come second in the 2010–11 season in the Regionalliga West. He then moved to SC Paderborn.

SC Paderborn
In 2011, Meha joined 2. Bundesliga side SC Paderborn 07 and made an immediate impact on the team.

2011–12 season
He made 33 appearances for the club and scored five goals; four of which were scored from direct free kicks and one from long distance. He also made ten assists during his first season with the club. Paderborn reached fifth place, nine points fewer than the first.

2012–13 season
On 13 August 2012, Paderborn coach Stephan Schmidt declared that Meha was "an extremely important player for Paderborn". Meha had begun his second season well, scoring a goal from a penalty against Hertha BSC on his first match of the season and scoring a goal from a direct free kick against VfL Bochum on his second. He returned after a break, scoring at the start of the season's second half on 10 February 2013, when Meha scored in the 87th minute from a difficult angle to the top right-hand corner of the goal in a 3–1 away victory against FC Ingolstadt. A week later on 15 February 2013, Meha scored, by penalty spot, the last goal of the 2–0 victory in the 40th minute against Erzgebirge Aue. He also participated in the opening goal in a free kick that was avoided by the goalkeeper and the ball was then sent into the goal by Tobias Feisthammel in the 20th minute. The last goal of the 2012–13 season was scored on 3 May 2013 against Dynamo Dresden in the 2–1 away loss.

Meha finished the 2012–13 season with 26 appearances and six goals. Three goals were scored from penalties, two from free kicks and one goal against FC Ingolstadt. Meha also made five assists in his second season with Paderborn, which finished in 12th place on the rank table.

2013–14 season
On 18 October 2013, Meha scored the first goal of the 2013–14 season; in the 54th minute he scored the last goal of the 4–2 victory against FSV Frankfurt. On 8 December 2013, he scored two goals in 4–2 away victory against Aalen; Meha scored in the 12th minute and in the 72nd minute. He debuted in 2014 with a goal on 9 February 2014; he scored a free-kick goal in the 47th minute, giving an away victory to Paderborn against Köln (1–0). In his next fixture match on 16 February 2014 against Arminia Bielefeld, Meha scored a goal in the victory 4–0. He scored again for the third consecutive game on 22 February 2014 against 1860 München, which finished in a 2–2 draw; Meha scored the second goal for 2–0 in the 18th minute.

On 28 February, Meha scored two more goals in the next match against VfL Bochum to help his team win the match 4–1. On 17 March 2014 Meha was honoured as "player of the month for February" for scoring five goals in four matches. Meha scored on 25 March 2014 against St. Pauli in a home victory 3–0. He continued his scoring form on 4 April 2014 when he scored a free kick in a 2–1 loss against Fortuna Düsseldorf. Meha captained Paderborn's team for the first time on 27 April 2014 in the match against Sandhausen, which finished as a 2–0 victory in which he played the full 90 minutes.

On 4 May 2014, Meha scored in the away victory 2–0 over Erzgebirge Aue; Meha scored the opening goal in the 35th minute. On the last day of the second division campaign, Paderborn came from behind to win 2-1 over VfR Aalen to secure automatic promotion to the Bundesliga, their first ever promotion to the Bundesliga.
Meha finished the 2013–14 season with 26 appearances, including one in the German Cup, scoring 12 goals during campaign where he ranked in sixth place, equal with Charlison Benschop, Patrick Helmes and Torsten Mattuschka in the 2. Bundesliga all goalscorers. Meha was voted as the best player of the season for Paderborn, giving a special contribution in the team success of the promotion for the first time in their history.

On 1 August 2014, Meha suffered an injury during a friendly match against Maccabi Haifa and was forced to undergo surgery, which according to doctors would keep him from playing for eight weeks.

2014–15 season
Due to the injury of the previous season, Alban Meha missed out the start of the 2014–15 season for five weeks.

On 27 September 2014, Meha debuted in the Bundesliga, playing in the sixth game week against Borussia Mönchengladbach, coming on as a substitute in the 78th minute in place of Lukas Rupp in a 2–1 loss. On 2 November 2014, Meha scored his first goal for Paderborn that season in a 3–1 home win against Hertha BSC. He scored from a powerful strike from the edge of the penalty area. On 14 December 2014, Meha scored from the penalty spot to give his team a 1–1 draw against the second-ranking team Wolfsburg at their home. Meha scored a goal from a free kick against Hannover 96 on 15 February 2015 to give his team the 2–1 away victory, coming from behind at 1–0 as Hannover 96 scored in the 66th minute with Marcelo then Srdjan Lakic of Paderborn scored the equalising 1–1 goal in the 72nd minute. Meha scored in the 79th minute to secure the win. It was his first goal of 2015 and he played a full 90-minute match.

Konyaspor
Following the relegation of Paderborn to the 2. Bundesliga; on 9 June 2015, Meha moved to Turkish Süper Lig side Konyaspor on a free transfer. After having spent his entire career in Germany, the move to Turkey was his first abroad. He signed a one-year contract with Konyaspor that included a one-year extension option. According to media reports he earns up to €1 million per season.

Meha made his Süper Lig debut on 16 August 2015 in the 2015–16 Süper Lig opening match against Akhisar Belediyespor, playing the full 90-minute match. He scored his first goal in the third match on 29 August 2015 against the defending champions Galatasaray with a free-kick for the 1–1 equaliser, but it was not enough; Galatasaray scored three more goals to take the 4–1 victory. In the next match on 13 September 2015 Meha scored against Osmanlıspor in the 61st minute of the match to make the score 2–1 and to sign away victory.

Al-Faisaly
On 24 December 2017, Meha joined Jordan Premier League side Al-Faisaly. On 15 January 2018, the club confirmed that Meha had joined the team. On 24 January 2018, he made his debut in a 2–0 away win against Al-Yarmouk after being named in the starting line-up.

International career

Albania
In summer 2012, Meha expressed his desire to play for Albania and that he had been in contact with national coach Gianni de Biasi. On 26 August 2012, it was reported that Meha had been invited to play for Albania in the September match against Cyprus, valid for the qualifiers of the FIFA World Cup 2014. On 4 September 2012, he received Albanian citizenship alongside fellow new member of the national team Burim Kukeli to be able to play for Albania. On 7 September 2012, Meha made his first international debut for Albania and led the Albanian midfield in a 3–1 victory against Cyprus, where he assisted the opening goal scored by Armando Sadiku. Because of his play-making abilities and strong set-piece capabilities, he is viewed by Albanian fans as the replacement for the retired Ervin Skela.
On 7 October 2012, Meha assisted a goal scored by Edgar Çani in a 2–1 loss against Iceland, valid for the qualifiers of the FIFA World Cup 2014. On 26 March 2013, Meha scored first goal for Albania against Lithuania in a 4–1 win.

Kosovo
On 30 August 2016, Meha received a call-up from Kosovo for a 2018 FIFA World Cup qualification match against Finland and made his debut after coming on as a substitute at 89th minute in place of Valon Berisha.

Career statistics

Club

International

Scores and results list Albania's goal tally first, score column indicates score after each Meha goal.

Honours 
Konyaspor
Turkish Cup: 2016–17

References

External links

1986 births
Living people
Sportspeople from Mitrovica, Kosovo
Kosovo Albanians
Kosovan footballers
Kosovo international footballers
Albanian footballers
Albania international footballers
Dual internationalists (football)
Association football midfielders
VfL Kirchheim/Teck players
SSV Reutlingen 05 players
SV Eintracht Trier 05 players
SC Paderborn 07 players
Konyaspor footballers
Al-Faisaly SC players
SV Elversberg players
2. Bundesliga players
Bundesliga players
Süper Lig players
Albanian expatriate footballers
Kosovan expatriate footballers
Expatriate footballers in Germany
Expatriate footballers in Turkey
Expatriate footballers in Jordan
Kosovan expatriate sportspeople in Germany
Kosovan expatriate sportspeople in Turkey
Albanian expatriate sportspeople in Germany
Albanian expatriate sportspeople in Turkey